The Maton River is a river of Puerto Rico.

It is spanned by the Río Matón Bridge, built in 1886.

See also
Río Matón Bridge: NRHP listing in Cayey, Puerto Rico
List of rivers of Puerto Rico

References

External links
 USGS Hydrologic Unit Map – Caribbean Region (1974)
Rios de Puerto Rico

Rivers of Puerto Rico